Roland Lortz (12 May 1937 – 14 April 2007) was a German weightlifter. He competed in the men's middleweight event at the 1960 Summer Olympics.

References

1937 births
2007 deaths
German male weightlifters
Olympic weightlifters of the United Team of Germany
Weightlifters at the 1960 Summer Olympics
Sportspeople from Darmstadt